An abjad (also abgad) is a writing system in which only consonants are represented, leaving vowel sounds to be inferred by the reader. This contrasts with other alphabets, which provide graphemes for both consonants and vowels. The term was introduced in 1990 by Peter T. Daniels. Other terms for the same concept include: partial phonemic script, segmentally linear defective phonographic script, consonantary, consonant writing, and consonantal alphabet.

Impure abjads represent vowels with either optional diacritics, a limited number of distinct vowel glyphs, or both.  The name abjad is based on the Arabic alphabet's first (in its original order)  four letters—corresponding to a, b, j, and d—to replace the more common terms "consonantary" and "consonantal alphabet", in describing the family of scripts classified as "West Semitic".

Etymology
The name "abjad" is derived from pronouncing the first letters of the Arabic alphabet order, in its original order. Similar to other semitic languages such as Phoenician, Hebrew  and Semitic proto-alphabets: specifically, aleph, bet, gimel, dalet.

Terminology
According to the formulations of Peter T. Daniels, abjads differ from alphabets in that only consonants, not vowels, are represented among the basic graphemes. Abjads differ from abugidas, another category defined by Daniels, in that in abjads, the vowel sound is implied by phonology, and where vowel marks exist for the system, such as nikkud for Hebrew and ḥarakāt for Arabic, their use is optional and not the dominant (or literate) form. Abugidas mark all vowels (other than the "inherent" vowel) with a diacritic, a minor attachment to the letter, a standalone glyph, or (in Canadian Aboriginal syllabics) by rotation of the letter. Some abugidas use a special symbol to suppress the inherent vowel so that the consonant alone can be properly represented. In a syllabary, a grapheme denotes a complete syllable, that is, either a lone vowel sound or a combination of a vowel sound with one or more consonant sounds.

The antagonism of abjad versus alphabet, as it was formulated by Daniels, has been rejected by some scholars because abjad is also used as a term not only for the Arabic numeral system but (most importantly in terms of historical grammatology) also as a term for the alphabetic device (i.e., letter order) of ancient Northwest Semitic scripts in opposition to the 'south Arabian' order. This caused fatal effects on terminology in general and especially in (ancient) Semitic philology. Also, it suggests that consonantal alphabets, in opposition to, for instance, the Greek alphabet, were not yet true alphabets and not yet entirely complete, lacking something important to be a fully working script system. It has also been objected that, as a set of letters, an alphabet is not the mirror of what should be there in a language from a phonological point of view; rather, it is the data stock of what provides maximum efficiency with least effort from a semantic point of view.

Origins

The first abjad to gain widespread usage was the Phoenician abjad. Unlike other contemporary scripts, such as cuneiform and Egyptian hieroglyphs, the Phoenician script consisted of only a few dozen symbols. This made the script easy to learn, and seafaring Phoenician merchants took the script throughout the then-known world.

The Phoenician abjad was a radical simplification of phonetic writing, since hieroglyphics required the writer to pick a hieroglyph starting with the same sound that the writer wanted to write in order to write phonetically, much as man'yōgana (kanji used solely for phonetic use) was used to represent Japanese phonetically before the invention of kana.

Phoenician gave rise to a number of new writing systems, including the widely used Aramaic abjad and the Greek alphabet. The Greek alphabet evolved into the modern western alphabets, such as Latin and Cyrillic, while Aramaic became the ancestor of many modern abjads and abugidas of Asia.

Impure abjads

Impure abjads have characters for some vowels, optional vowel diacritics, or both. The term pure abjad refers to scripts entirely lacking in vowel indicators. However, most modern abjads, such as Arabic, Hebrew, Aramaic, and Pahlavi, are "impure" abjadsthat is, they also contain symbols for some of the vowel phonemes, although the said non-diacritic vowel letters are also used to write certain consonants, particularly approximants that sound similar to long vowels. A "pure" abjad is exemplified (perhaps) by very early forms of ancient Phoenician, though at some point (at least by the 9th century BC) it and most of the contemporary Semitic abjads had begun to overload a few of the consonant symbols with a secondary function as vowel markers, called matres lectionis. This practice was at first rare and limited in scope but became increasingly common and more developed in later times.

Addition of vowels

In the 9th century BC the Greeks adapted the Phoenician script for use in their own language. The phonetic structure of the Greek language created too many ambiguities when vowels went unrepresented, so the script was modified. They did not need letters for the guttural sounds represented by aleph, he, heth or ayin, so these symbols were assigned vocalic values. The letters waw and yod were also adapted into vowel signs; along with he, these were already used as matres lectionis in Phoenician. The major innovation of Greek was to dedicate these symbols exclusively and unambiguously to vowel sounds that could be combined arbitrarily with consonants (as opposed to syllabaries such as Linear B which usually have vowel symbols but cannot combine them with consonants to form arbitrary syllables).

Abugidas developed along a slightly different route. The basic consonantal symbol was considered to have an inherent "a" vowel sound. Hooks or short lines attached to various parts of the basic letter modify the vowel. In this way, the South Arabian abjad evolved into the Ge'ez abugida of Ethiopia between the 5th century BC and the 5th century AD. Similarly,  the  Brāhmī abugida of the Indian subcontinent developed around the 3rd century BC (from the Aramaic abjad, it has been hypothesized).

The other major family of abugidas, Canadian Aboriginal syllabics, was initially developed in the 1840s by missionary and linguist James Evans for the Cree and Ojibwe languages. Evans used features of Devanagari script and Pitman shorthand to create his initial abugida. Later in the 19th century, other missionaries adapted Evans's system to other Canadian aboriginal languages. Canadian syllabics differ from other abugidas in that the vowel is indicated by rotation of the consonantal symbol, with each vowel having a consistent orientation.

Abjads and the structure of Semitic languages
The abjad form of writing is well-adapted to the morphological structure of the Semitic languages it was developed to write. This is because words in Semitic languages are formed from a root consisting of (usually) three consonants, the vowels being used to indicate inflectional or derived forms. In most cases, the absence of full glyphs for vowels makes the common root clearer, allowing readers to guess the meaning of unfamiliar words from familiar roots (especially in conjunction with context clues) and improving word recognition while reading for practiced readers.

By contrast, the Arabic and Hebrew scripts sometimes perform the role of true alphabets rather than abjads when used to write certain Indo-European languages, including Kurdish, Bosnian, and Yiddish.

Comparative chart of Abjads, extinct and extant

See also
 Abjad numerals (Arabic alphanumeric code)
 Abugida
 Gematria (Hebrew & English system of alphanumeric code)
 Numerology
 Shorthand (constructed writing systems that are structurally abjads)

References

Sources

External links
The Science of Arabic Letters, Abjad and Geometry, by Jorge Lupin 

 
Arabic orthography